Saint-Guy is a municipality in the Bas-Saint-Laurent region of Quebec, Canada.

Demographics

Population

Language

See also
 List of municipalities in Quebec

References

Municipalities in Quebec
Incorporated places in Bas-Saint-Laurent